Robert James Lightfoot (often known as Rob Lightfoot, born 16 July 1963) is a British former grasstrack and motorcycle speedway rider.

Biography
Born in Coventry, Lightfoot is the son of Jim Lightfoot, who also had a career in speedway, riding for Coventry Bees and Long Eaton Archers. He initially excelled as a junior grasstrack rider, winning several tournaments including the Welsh Open Championship (1979, 1980), the Sportac Spectacular (1978), and the Worcester and Cotswold Club Championship (1979). He began his speedway career in 1979, making his debut for Stoke Potters later that year. In 1980 he signed for Leicester Lions, riding in two inter-league cup matches, and was loaned back to Stoke, for whom he rode in twenty National League matches that year, averaging 3.39. He also rode in Leicester's junior team in the Anglia Junior League, and won the Anglia Junior League Riders' Championship in 1980. In 1981 he won the British Junior Championship at Canterburythe 1981 ‘Pride of the Potteries’ and averaged over 6.5 for Stoke on the National League. 

His career was interrupted in 1982 by a crash in which he broke his neck. On his return in 1983 he rode in second-half races at Leicester, and made a handful of senior appearances for the Lions, but a string of crashes took their toll and he retired at the end of the 1983 season.

References

1963 births
Living people
British speedway riders
English motorcycle racers
Sportspeople from Coventry
Stoke Potters riders
Leicester Lions riders